This is a page of Kareem Abdul-Jabbar's athletic achievements.

Awards

NBA achievements
Naismith Memorial Basketbal Hall of Fame Class of 1995
6-time NBA champion: 1971, 1980, 1982, 1985, 1987, 1988
10 NBA Finals appearances: 1971, 1974, 1980, 1982–1985, 1987–1989
6-time NBA Most Valuable Player: 1971, 1972, 1974, 1976, 1977, 1980
2-time scoring champion: 1971, 1972
1-time rebounding leader: 1976
4-time blocks leader: 1975–1976, 1979–1980
1-time field goal percentage leader: 1977
19-time NBA All-Star: 1970–1977, 1979–1989
Selected, but did not play due to personal reasons in 1973.
2-time NBA Finals Most Valuable Player: 1971, 1985
15-time All-NBA selection:
First Team: 1971–1974, 1976–1977, 1980, 1981, 1984, 1986
Second Team: 1970, 1978, 1979, 1983, 1985
11-time All-Defensive selection:
First Team: 1974, 1975, 1979, 1980, 1981
Second Team: 1970, 1971, 1976, 1977, 1978, 1984
NBA All-Rookie selection:
First Team: 1970
NBA Rookie of the Year: 1970
 6-time The Sporting News Most Valuable Player: 1971, 1972, 1974, 1976, 1977, 1980
 Sports Illustrated Sportsman of the Year: 1985
Ranked #7 by SLAM Magazine's Top 50 Players of All-time
Selected in 1996 as one of the "50 Greatest Players in NBA History"
Selected in 1996 as member of one of the "Top 10 Teams in NBA History"
1986–87 Los Angeles Lakers (65–17; .793)
A statue of Abdul-Jabbar was unveiled in front of Staples Center on Chick Hearn Court in Los Angeles on November 16, 2012.

College
 National Collegiate Basketball Hall of Fame (2007)
 Three-time NCAA champion (1967, 1968, 1969)
 Most Outstanding Player in NCAA Tournament (1967, 1968, 1969)
 Player of the Year (1967, 1969)
 Three-time First Team All-American (1967, 1968, 1969)
 Naismith College Player of the Year (1969)
 3× First-team All-Pac-8 (1967–1969)

NBA statistics

Totals

Career highs

Regular season

Playoffs

40-point games
70 times in the regular season
55 with Milwaukee Bucks
15 with Los Angeles Lakers

50-point games
All of Abdul-Jabbar's 50-point efforts occurred while he played for the Milwaukee Bucks. 

30-rebound games
3 times in the regular season

NBA records and former records

Regular season

Service
Seasons: 20 (Milwaukee Bucks, —; Los Angeles Lakers, —)
Broken by Robert Parish in 

Games, career: 1,560
Broken by Robert Parish on April 6, 1996

Minutes, career: 57,446

Scoring
Points, career: 38,387
Broken by LeBron James on February 7, 2023

Seasons scoring 2,000 or more points: 9 (—, —, —)
Broken by Michael Jordan and Karl Malone in 

Seasons scoring 1,000 or more points: 19 (—)
Broken by LeBron James in 

Consecutive games scoring 10 or more points: 787, December 4, 1977 to December 2, 1987
Broken by Michael Jordan on December 30, 1997

Field goals
Field goals made, career: 15,837

Field goal attempts, career: 28,307

Rebounding
Defensive rebounds, career: 9,394
Broken by Robert Parish on January 26, 1994

Defensive rebounds, season: 1,111

Defensive rebounds, game: 29, Los Angeles Lakers vs. Detroit Pistons, December 14, 1975

Personal fouls
Personal fouls, career: 4,657

Blocked shots
Seasons leading the league in blocked shots: 4 (—, —)
Tied by Mark Eaton and Marcus Camby

Consecutive seasons leading the league in blocked shots: 2 (—, —)
Broken by Dikembe Mutombo in 

Blocked shots, career: 3,189
Broken by Hakeem Olajuwon on April 21, 1996

Playoffs

Service
Years played: 18

Games, career: 237
Broken by Robert Horry on May 13, 2008

Minutes played, career: 8,851
Broken by Tim Duncan on June 12, 2014

Minutes played, 7-game series: 345, Milwaukee Bucks vs. Boston Celtics, 1974 NBA Finals

Scoring
Points, career: 5,762
Broken by Michael Jordan on May 31, 1998

Consecutive games scoring 20 or more points: 57, April 13, 1973 to April 5, 1981
Broken by Michael Jordan on May 2, 1993

Consecutive games scoring 20 or more points, from start of playoff career: 27

Games scoring 10 or more points, career: 223
Broken by Tim Duncan on June 12, 2014

Field goals
Field goals made, career: 2,356

Field goals made, 4-game series: 65, Milwaukee Bucks vs. Chicago Bulls, 1974 Western Conference Finals

Field goal attempts, career: 4,422
Broken by Michael Jordan on June 10, 1998

Rebounding
Offensive rebounds, 5-game series: 29, Milwaukee Bucks vs. Los Angeles Lakers, 1974 Western Conference Semifinals
Broken by Hakeem Olajuwon in 1985

Defensive rebounds, 4-game series: 62, Milwaukee Bucks vs. Chicago Bulls, 1974 Western Conference Finals

Defensive rebounds, 5-game series: 61, Milwaukee Bucks vs. Los Angeles Lakers, 1974 Western Conference Semifinals
Broken by Jack Sikma in 1979

Defensive rebounds, 7-game series: 95, Los Angeles Lakers vs. Golden State Warriors, 1977 Western Conference Semifinals

Blocked shots
Blocked shots, career: 476
Broken by Tim Duncan on May 31, 2012

Blocked shots, 3-game series: 15, Los Angeles Lakers vs. Denver Nuggets, 1979 Western Conference First Round
Broken by Manute Bol in 1989

Blocked shots, 4-game series: 15, Los Angeles Lakers vs. Portland Trail Blazers, 1977 Western Conference Finals
Broken by Mark Eaton in 1986

Blocked shots, game: 9, Los Angeles Lakers vs. Golden State Warriors, April 22, 1977
Broken by Mark Eaton on April 26, 1985

Personal fouls
Personal fouls, career: 797

Finals

Service
Highest average, minutes per game, any championship series: 49.3, Milwaukee Bucks vs. Boston Celtics, 1974 (345/7)

Minutes, 7-game series: 345, Milwaukee Bucks vs. Boston Celtics, 1974

Minutes, game: 58, Milwaukee Bucks at Boston Celtics, May 10, 1974 (2 OT)
Broken by Garfield Heard and Jo Jo White on June 4, 1976 (3 OT)

Scoring
Points, 4-game series: 108, Milwaukee Bucks vs. Baltimore Bullets, 1971
Broken by Rick Barry in 1975

Scoring 20 or more points in all games, 7-game series: Milwaukee Bucks vs. Boston Celtics, 1974
Also achieved by Bob Pettit (1960), Elgin Baylor (1962), Jerry West (1962, 1969, 1970), Larry Bird (1984), Hakeem Olajuwon (1994) and Kobe Bryant (2010)

Field goals
Highest field goal percentage, 4-game series: .605 (46—76), Milwaukee Bucks vs. Baltimore Bullets, 1971
Broken by Derrek Dickey in 1975

Field goals, 4-game series: 46, Milwaukee Bucks vs. Baltimore Bullets, 1971

Blocked shots
Blocked shots, career: 116

Blocked shots, 6-game series: 23, Los Angeles Lakers vs. Philadelphia 76ers, 1980
Broken by Tim Duncan in 2003

All-Star
Points, career: 251
Broken by Michael Jordan in 2003

Games, career: 18

Minutes, career: 449

Field goals made, career: 105
Broken by Michael Jordan in 2003

Field goal attempts, career: 213
Broken by Michael Jordan in 2003

Blocked shots, career: 31

Personal fouls, career: 57

Personal fouls, game: 6 (1970)

Other records
All-NBA Team selections: 15
Tied by Kobe Bryant, Tim Duncan, and LeBron James

NBA Most Valuable Player Awards (regular season): 6

One of five players in NBA history to lead the league in blocks and rebounding in the same season
Averaged 4.1 blocks and 16.9 rebounds per game.
The other four players are Bill Walton, Hakeem Olajuwon, Ben Wallace, and Dwight Howard.

One of three players in NBA history to win the NBA Finals Most Valuable Player Award with two different franchises
Abdul-Jabbar won the award with the Milwaukee Bucks in 1971 and with the Los Angeles Lakers in 1985.
Achieved by LeBron James with the Miami Heat in 2012 and 2013 and the Cleveland Cavaliers in 2016.
Also by Kawhi Leonard in 2014 with the San Antonio Spurs and in 2019 with the Toronto Raptors.

One of fourteen players in NBA history to win at least six NBA championships
Also includes Scottie Pippen (6), Michael Jordan (6), Bob Cousy (6). Robert Horry (7), Frank Ramsey (7), Jim Loscutoff (7). John Havlicek (8), Satch Sanders (8), K. C. Jones (8), Tom Heinsohn (8), Steve Kerr (9) including 4 as a coach. Sam Jones (10). Bill Russell (11).

World Records
Most Points by a Basketball Player in his career (college, regular season, playoffs and all-star): 46,725
Broken in 2001 by Oscar Schmidt after scoring his 46,727th career point.

See also

NBA
 List of National Basketball Association career games played leaders
 List of National Basketball Association career scoring leaders
 List of National Basketball Association career rebounding leaders
 List of National Basketball Association career assists leaders
 List of National Basketball Association career blocks leaders
 List of National Basketball Association career turnovers leaders
 List of National Basketball Association career free throw scoring leaders
 List of National Basketball Association career minutes played leaders
 List of National Basketball Association career playoff scoring leaders
 List of National Basketball Association career playoff rebounding leaders
 List of National Basketball Association career playoff blocks leaders
 List of National Basketball Association career playoff turnovers leaders
 List of National Basketball Association career playoff free throw scoring leaders
 List of National Basketball Association single-game rebounding leaders
 List of National Basketball Association players with most blocks in a game
 List of National Basketball Association annual scoring leaders
 List of National Basketball Association annual rebounding leaders
 List of National Basketball Association annual blocks leaders
 List of National Basketball Association season field goal percentage leaders
 List of National Basketball Association seasons played leaders
 List of National Basketball Association top rookie scoring averages

College
 List of NCAA Division I men's basketball players with 60 or more points in a game
 List of NCAA Division I men's basketball players with 2000 points and 1000 rebounds

References

External links

 Official Kareem Abdul-Jabbar website
 Kareem Abdul-Jabbar's Blog
 

Abdul-Jabbar, Kareem
Los Angeles Lakers
Milwaukee Bucks